The 2021–22 FA WSL season (also known as the Barclays FA Women's Super League for sponsorship reasons) was the eleventh season of the FA Women's Super League (WSL) since it was formed in 2010. It was the fourth season after the rebranding of the four highest levels in English women's football.

On 4 May 2022, Birmingham City were relegated following a 6–0 defeat away at Manchester City with one game remaining. Members of the WSL since it was founded in 2011, it ended Birmingham's twenty-year stint as a top-flight club having last been promoted as the 2001–02 FA Women's Premier League Northern Division champions.

Chelsea successfully defended the title by beating Manchester United 4–2 in the final matchday, winning their third consecutive and fifth overall WSL title.

Teams
Twelve teams contested the 2021–22 FA WSL season. At the end of the previous season, Bristol City were relegated after four seasons in the WSL while Leicester City were promoted for the first time.

Stadium changes 
Two teams changed home ground prior to the start of the season: Birmingham City relocated from Damson Park to St Andrew's, home of the team's male affiliate since 1906. Leicester City prepared for their maiden WSL season by moving to their parent club's main stadium, King Power Stadium, with Burton Albion's Pirelli Stadium serving as backup when fixtures clash with Leicester's men's side.

Personnel and kits

Managerial changes

League table

Results

Positions by round
The table lists the positions of teams after each week of matches. In order to preserve chronological progress, any postponed matches are not included in the round at which they were originally scheduled, but added to the full round they were played immediately afterwards. For example, if a match is scheduled for round 13, but then postponed and played between rounds 16 and 17, it will be added to the standings for round 16.

Results by round

Season statistics

Top scorers

Top assists

Clean sheets

Hat-tricks

Discipline

Awards

Monthly awards

Annual awards

References

External links
Official website

Women's Super League seasons
1
2021–22 domestic women's association football leagues